Eltham is a small inland town in South Taranaki, New Zealand, located  south of the city of New Plymouth and southeast of the volcanic cone of Mount Taranaki/Egmont. State Highway 3 runs through the town.

Eltham is South Taranaki's second largest town.

Eltham is known as the cradle of the Taranaki dairy industry (the co-operative system in particular), and for being the one place in New Zealand that manufactured rennet which is important in cheesemaking. It was also the first place to export butter to England.

History
European settlement began in Eltham in the 1870s, with blocks of densely forested land being taken up mainly to the north of Mountain Road. A profusion of sawmilling companies cleared the district which, when grassed, proved ideal for dairy farming.   In 1884, the year Eltham was declared a town district, settlers, mainly from England, arrived there and the town had a population of 25. Eltham was declared a borough in 1901, and became part of South Taranaki District with the local body amalgamations of 1989.

High Street (which runs through the centre of town - as part of State Highway 3 connecting Stratford, Ngaere, Normanby and Hāwera) and Bridge Street (which heads westward towards Kaponga and joins State Highway 45 near Ōpunake), were the first tar-sealed roads in New Zealand.

Geography

Rivers and lakes

The two main watercourses which run through Eltham itself are the Mangawharawhara Stream, and the Waingongoro River.

The Mangawharawhara Stream runs to the east of the Main Trunk railway line, flows under the central business district via a culvert, and on past Eltham School and the Eltham Golf Club to the south of the town.

The Waingongoro River forms a western boundary to the town itself, flowing through the Presbyterian Church campsite (in the town's northwest) and Taumata Park (the town's main camping area and sports ground - in the western part of the town) and winding itself southwestward to meet the Tasman Sea at Ohawe Beach, near Hāwera.

Eltham is also the gateway to Lake Rotokare, a scenic, natural lake surrounded by native bush (to the east of the town), and to the man-made Lake Rotorangi.

Demographics

There were 801 households. There were 984 males and 951 females, giving a sex ratio of 1.03 males per female. The median age was 39.7 years (compared with 37.4 years nationally), with 423 people (21.9%) aged under 15 years, 315 (16.3%) aged 15 to 29, 870 (45.0%) aged 30 to 64, and 321 (16.6%) aged 65 or older.

Ethnicities were 79.4% European/Pākehā, 30.2% Māori, 3.4% Pacific peoples, 3.7% Asian, and 1.9% other ethnicities (totals add to more than 100% since people could identify with multiple ethnicities).

The proportion of people born overseas was 8.4%, compared with 27.1% nationally.

Although some people objected to giving their religion, 53.5% had no religion, 30.1% were Christian, 0.2% were Hindu, 0.9% were Muslim, 0.3% were Buddhist and 5.0% had other religions.

Of those at least 15 years old, 102 (6.7%) people had a bachelor or higher degree, and 510 (33.7%) people had no formal qualifications. The median income was $24,400, compared with $31,800 nationally. The employment status of those at least 15 was that 684 (45.2%) people were employed full-time, 189 (12.5%) were part-time, and 90 (6.0%) were unemployed.

Local administration

Eltham and the surrounding community enjoys a full library and council service (coming under the aegis of the South Taranaki District Council, based in Hāwera). Services provided include being able to register your dog, pay your rates or inquire about obtaining a building permit. The LibraryPlus is also a NZ Post agency. Other services include a Tot Time for the under 5s and regular ‘coffee and blog’ meetings for locals to learn about new technologies in a friendly environment. The LibraryPlus also has three APN computers, offering free internet and Skype to the public.

Industry
The town's main industry is cheese production, with much of Mainland Cheese's speciality range such as feta and camembert being produced in the Bridge Street factory.

Other cheese products such as the processed cheese used in many burgers are produced at the company's Collingwood Street site, formerly occupied by the Taranaki Co-operative Dairy Company's milk powder plant, but now extensively remodelled.

Cheese has been used as a central symbol of the town, and to reinforce this view, the town's water supply tank was painted to represent a large block of cheese in 2002.

Eltham's other significant industry is the ANZCO ( formerly Riverlands) freezing works, which has a satellite plant in Bulls, in Manawatu. Both plants can process up to 1250 head of cattle daily.

Education 

Notable people
 Amyas Connell (1901–1980), architect
 Martin Donnelly (1917–1999), cricketer and rugby union player
 Gavin Hill (born 1965), rugby union and rugby league player
 Charles Knight aka Tankboy (born 1967), television producer
 Brian Muller (1942–2019), rugby union player
 Geoff Old (born 1956), rugby union player
 Bryce Robins (born 1980), rugby union player
 Ronald Syme (1903–1989), historian and classicist
 Walter Symes (1852–1914), politician
 Chau Tseung (or Chew Chong) (1828–1920), founder of the factory system of butter manufacture in the late 1880s
 Roger Urbahn (1934–1984), rugby union player

References

External links
 South Taranaki District Council
 Eltham School website

South Taranaki District
Populated places in Taranaki